Holly Mount (originally Hollymount) is a detached house in Knotty Green in Buckinghamshire. It was designed by the English architect C.F.A. Voysey and was built between 1904 and 1907. It has been listed Grade II* on the National Heritage List for England since October 1973.

References

Cole, David. (2015) The Art and Architecture of C.F.A Voysey: English Pioneer Modernist Architect and Designer Images Publishing

External links
Photographs of Holly Mount

Arts and Crafts architecture in England
Beaconsfield
Buildings by C.F.A. Voysey
Grade II* listed houses in Buckinghamshire
Houses completed in 1907